Inhibin, beta B, also known as INHBB, is a protein which in humans is encoded by the INHBB gene. INHBB is a subunit of both activin and inhibin, two closely related glycoproteins with opposing biological effects.

Function

Inhibin 

Inhibins are heterodimeric glycoproteins composed of an α subunit (INHA) and one of two homologous, but distinct, β subunits (βA or βB, this protein). mRNA for the two subunits has been demonstrated in the testes of adult rats.  Inhibin can bind specifically to testicular interstitial cells throughout development and may be an important regulator of Leydig cell testosterone production or interstitial cell function.

The inhibin beta B subunit joins the α subunit to form a pituitary FSH secretion inhibitor.  Inhibin has been shown to regulate gonadal stromal cell proliferation negatively and to have tumour-suppressor activity.  In addition, serum levels of inhibin have been shown to reflect the size of granulosa-cell tumors and can therefore be used as a marker for primary as well as recurrent disease.   Because expression in gonadal and various extragonadal tissues may vary severalfold in a tissue-specific fashion, it is proposed that inhibin may be both a growth/differentiation factor and a hormone.

Activin 

Furthermore, the beta B subunit forms a homodimer, activin B, and also joins with the beta A subunit to form a heterodimer, activin AB, both of which stimulate FSH secretion.

Tissue distribution 

Sections of testicular tissue from rat revealed positive immunoreactivity against anti-inhibin intensely appeared in Leydig cells. In adult animals, binding of 125I inhibin was localized primarily to the interstitial compartment of the testis.  Also, Jin et al., (2001) reported that Leydig cells showed strong positive staining for the inhibin βA subunit in pigs testis.

Receptors 

In situ ligand binding studies have shown that 125I inhibin βA binds specifically to Leydig cells throughout rat testis development. These results suggest that inhibin has been considered as a regulator of Leydig cell differentiated function. Recently, additional inhibin specific binding proteins were identified in inhibin target tissues, including pituitary and Leydig cells. From these receptors betaglycan (the TGF-β type III receptor) and InhBP/p120 (a membrane-tethered proteoglycan) were identified as putative inhibin receptors and they are all present in Leydig cells. However, a faint positive reaction was detected in Leydig cell cytoplasm in rats treated with anise oil. This may be related to the damaged Leydig cells, as a result of the decreasing of inhibin expression. This may be related to its content of safrole.

Cancer 
INHBB gene has been observed progressively downregulated in Human papillomavirus-positive neoplastic keratinocytes derived from uterine cervical  preneoplastic lesions at different levels of malignancy.  For this reason, INHBB is likely to be associated with tumorigenesis and may be a potential prognostic marker for uterine cervical  preneoplastic lesions progression.

References

Further reading

Estrogen regulation